Astrid of Sweden (17 November 1905 – 29 August 1935) was the Queen of the Belgians and the first wife of King Leopold III. Originally a princess of Sweden of the House of Bernadotte, Astrid became the Duchess of Brabant after her marriage to Leopold in November 1926. She was Queen of the Belgians from 23 February 1934 until her death. Her charity work focused particularly on women and children.

Astrid's only daughter, Joséphine-Charlotte, later became Grand Duchess consort of Luxembourg, while both her sons reigned as King of the Belgians. Astrid was also a sister of Crown Princess Märtha of Norway (wife of King Olav V) and a maternal aunt of King Harald V of Norway.

Early life

Princess Astrid was born on 17 November 1905 at the Arvfurstens Palats in Stockholm. She was the third child and youngest daughter of Prince Carl, Duke of Västergötland, and his wife, Princess Ingeborg of Denmark. Her father was the third son of Oscar II, King of Sweden and Norway, by his wife, Sophia of Nassau, and was a younger brother of King Gustav V of Sweden. Her mother was a daughter of King Frederick VIII of Denmark by his wife, Louise of Sweden, and the younger sister of kings Christian X of Denmark and Haakon VII of Norway.

Astrid had two elder sisters, Margaretha, Princess Axel of Denmark, and Märtha, Crown Princess of Norway, as well as a younger brother, Prince Carl Bernadotte (prev. Prince Carl of Sweden, Duke of Östergötland).

Astrid spent most of her childhood at Arvfurstens Palats in central Stockholm and at the family's summer residence in Fridhem. Astrid was raised with a strict education and little luxury. She attended, first, the Sint Botvid boarding school, where lessons were taught in French, then went on to Akerstrom-Soderstrom finishing school, where she studied sewing, piano, ballet and childcare. After finishing school, Astrid worked, caring for children at a Stockholm orphanage.

Engagement and wedding

As an eligible princess, Astrid was mentioned as a potential bride for a number of princes including the future Edward VIII of the United Kingdom and the future Olav V of Norway. Astrid's successful suitor was Prince Leopold of Belgium, Duke of Brabant.

In September 1926, their engagement was announced. King Albert I and Queen Elisabeth of Belgium invited the press to the royal palace in Brussels. The King said: "The Queen and I would like to announce to you the impending marriage between Prince Leopold, Duke of Brabant and the Princess Astrid of Sweden. We are convinced that the princess will bring joy and happiness to our son. Leopold and Astrid have decided to join their lives without any pressures or reasons of state. Theirs is a true union among people with the same inclinations." Queen Elisabeth said: "It is a marriage of love... tell it to our people. Nothing was arranged. Not a single political consideration prevailed in our son's decision."

Princess Astrid married Prince Leopold in Stockholm on 4 November 1926 civilly, and in Cathedral of St. Michael and St. Gudula, Brussels on 10 November religiously. The couple travelled separately to Antwerp after their civil marriage, to be reunited in Belgium. The religious marriage was attended by a large wedding party of young friends and relatives: Princess Feodora of Denmark, Princess Marie-José of Belgium, Princess Märtha of Sweden, Princess Ingrid of Sweden, Alfhild Ekelund, Prince Carl of Sweden, Prince Gustav Adolf of Sweden, Crown Prince Olav of Norway, Margareta Stähl, Count Claes Sparre, Anna Adelswärd, Prince Charles of Belgium, Count Folke Bernadotte, Baron Sigvard Beck-Friis, Anne Marie von Essen, and Baron Carl Strömfelt.

Princess Astrid was given a tiara as a wedding gift from the Belgian government, created by Belgian jeweler Van Bever. The original version of the diadem is a flexible diamond bandeau in a stylized Greek key motif topped with 11 large diamonds on spikes. These large stones, totaling around 100 carats on their own, symbolized the nine provinces of Belgium and the now former Belgian colony of the Congo. She later added a set of diamond arches to enclose each of the 11 independent stones. After Astrid's death, the tiara was in the possession of King Leopold, and his second wife Lilian, Princess of Réthy wore parts of the tiara but not the full gem as Lilian never held the title of Queen. Leopold abdicated the throne in favor of his son Baudouin; when Baudouin married, Leopold gave the tiara to the new queen, Fabiola, who wore it on her wedding day. She handed the jewel over after Baudouin's death to be worn by Queen Paola who, after the abdication of her husband Albert, gave it to Mathilde, the new Queen of the Belgians.

Duchess of Brabant

The Duke and Duchess of Brabant spent their honeymoon in the south of France before moving into a wing of the Royal Palace of Brussels. After the honeymoon period, Princess Astrid began learning French and Dutch. Astrid was enthusiastically adopted by the Belgians. She was widely loved for her beauty, charm and simplicity. As the Duchess of Brabant, she worked to alleviate various forms of adversity.

In October 1927, Leopold and Astrid had a daughter, Princess Joséphine-Charlotte, later Grand Duchess of Luxembourg. The birth of her only daughter had been a difficult period for Astrid, as women were barred from the line of succession to the throne. One year later, she and her husband visited the Dutch East Indies, now Indonesia. They arrived on the ship Insulinde. When the couple visited Surakarta, Astrid and her husband received a box with a golden kris inside as a present from the Dutch East Indie government. Princess Astrid received a box with a fan inlaid with gold inside as a gift. Local people admired Princess Astrid's warm, enthusiastic and less formal attitude. The couple visited Radio Poestoko Museum and Societet Habiprojo, where they watched a wayang show. They also visited Surabaya and Bali. After having spent five months in the Dutch East Indies, the couple travelled back to Belgium on the ship Tjerimai. Upon their return, the couple moved into Stuyvenberg Castle. In September 1930, Astrid gave birth to Prince Baudouin, who eventually became King of the Belgians.

Raised as a Lutheran, Astrid converted to Catholicism after marrying Leopold. She had initially considered converting to Catholicism, simply because it was the religion of Belgium, but the priest she consulted, Father William Hemmick, told her not to do so until she genuinely believed it was the true religion. Astrid converted to Catholicism in 1930, confiding to a close childhood friend: "My soul has found peace." On the day of Astrid's conversion, her father-in-law King Albert I said: "I am glad, very glad. Now all the family is united in the same religion."

In 1932, Astrid and her husband traveled to Asia and the Congo. According to a May 1933 print of De Locomotief, the photographs of their visit to the Dutch East Indies were published as a photograph collection book titled De Reis van Prins Leopold door Ned-Indie. After their visit to the Congo, Astrid wrote to her friend Countess Anna Sparre (née Baroness Anna Adelswärd) about the majestic landscapes of Congo land and her concerns about suffering, poverty and infant mortality that the Congolese faced.

The Duchess of Brabant became a godmother to Anna Sparre's daughter, Christina, and her sister Crown Princess Märtha's second daughter, Princess Astrid.

Queen 
On 17 February 1934, King Albert I died in a mountain-climbing accident in Marche-les-Dames, Belgium. Leopold and Astrid became the new King and Queen of the Belgians with the style of Majesty. Later that year, the third child of Leopold and Astrid was born. He was named Albert after his grandfather and would eventually succeed his brother Baudouin as King of the Belgians.

As Queen of the Belgians, Astrid dedicated her time to raising her children and promoting social causes that brought her into contact with the Belgians. She was very concerned by the situation of women, children, and disadvantaged people. During an economic crisis in Belgium in 1935, she organized a collection of clothing, money and food for the poor through an open letter, which was published as the "Queen’s Appeal". Queen Astrid also visited poor settlements in Belgium.

Queen Astrid was particularly interested in training women formally in childcare and healthcare. She also supported the training of young girls as dressmakers so they would have better career opportunities. She supported Catholic charitable institutions, such as the Sisters of St. Vincent de Paul, and liberal organizations, such as the Fédération des Foyers Belges. She also gave audiences to advocates of women's rights such as Baroness Marthe Boël, president of the National Council of Belgian Women.

In May 1935, Queen Astrid patronized Milk Week, an effort to encourage Belgians to drink healthy beverages. She charged Gatien du Parc, one of her courtiers, with the task of preparing a detailed report on milk regulations in foreign countries with a strict investigation. Queen Astrid often did charitable works as part of a Relief Committee.

Hobbies and personality 
Queen Astrid had a warm, friendly, social and charming personality. According to her friend Countess Anna Sparre, Astrid was a shy and insecure woman. Sparre believed that Astrid's mother Princess Ingeborg's constant praising of her sister Märtha contributed to her shyness and insecurity. Astrid, apparently a timid and fragile woman, could be fierce and stern when she had to defend a wronged loved one.

She collected Swedish folk art and enjoyed sports such as swimming, skiing, climbing, horseback riding and golf.

Death

Astrid died on 29 August 1935 in a car accident at Küssnacht am Rigi. 

In August 1935, the King and Queen went incognito to their holiday home, Villa Haslihorn in Horw, on the shores of Lake Lucerne, Switzerland. Joséphine-Charlotte and Baudouin travelled with their parents, while the one-year-old Prince Albert remained in Brussels.

On 29 August 1935, the King and Queen went for a last hike in the mountains before returning home. Their chauffeur was sitting in the back of the Packard One-Twenty convertible; the King was driving and the Queen looking at a map. At approximately 9:30 am the Queen pointed out something to her husband, who looked away from the road. The car left the road, travelled down a steep slope, and collided with a pear tree. Queen Astrid had opened her door and was thrown out upon impact, striking the trunk of the tree while the car hit a second tree. 

Queen Astrid is interred in the royal vault at the Church of Our Lady of Laeken, Brussels, beside her husband, King Leopold III, and his second wife, Lilian, Princess of Réthy.

Legacy

Folklore 
, a Swiss historian, describes how Queen Astrid entered folklore in Belgium and Switzerland. Months after her death, newlyweds were bringing flowers to the place where the Queen died. The chapel visitors would also bring wreaths and candles. The visits peaked on feasts of All Saints and All Souls. The Queen was described as an icon of beauty, kindness, romance, marriage and a model Catholic. The Mayor of Küssnacht told the Belgian Ambassador to Switzerland: "It is on pilgrimage that these couples arrive here from all over the canton. These young newlyweds, in bridal dress, whom you saw visiting the place where Queen Astrid passed away, are imploring her protection. Your young Queen has become part of Swiss legend; she is, for our people, who have beatified her in their hearts, the symbol of maternal love and conjugal fidelity."

Memorials

In 1935, the Belgian postal authorities issued a postage stamp showing her portrait outlined in black. This is known as the Astrid Mourning issue. Later that same year, it released a series of anti-tuberculosis fund stamps with the same design.  in 8th arrondissement of Paris was named in her memory.

A commemorative chapel named Astrid Chapel was built in Switzerland at the site of the crash. The Swiss government gave the land to Belgium a year after Astrid's death and the chapel was built in the style of a Walloon country church. The chapel has become a destination for Swedish and Belgian tourists. The King's Cross, built in where the Queen died in her husband's arms, is made from Swedish granite. A museum nearby holds images and memorabilia of the event, including a shard from the windscreen and the log of the pear tree. The tree itself was felled by a storm in 1992. The car was sunk at a deep part of the Vierwaldstättersee at the request of the king.

A memorial was built by the architect Paul Bonduelle in Laeken, Belgium, and inaugurated on 21 July 1938. The building, which is in the late neo-classical style, faces the Church of Our Lady of Laeken and backs onto the Palace of Laeken. The same year, on the initiative of the local Veterans' Front, a bronze bust of the Queen was erected in Wisterzée Park in Court-Saint-Étienne, Belgium, by sculptor Victor Rousseau.

Astrid Avenue in Bogor Botanical Garden in Indonesia (formerly Dutch East Indies) was named after her while she was honeymooning there with her spouse in 1928. The avenue is decorated with spectacular displays of canna lilies of various colors. The Swedish layer cake Princess cake was named after Astrid and her two sisters when they were children.

Names 
Four of her descendants were named Astrid to honour her. Her granddaughters Princess Marie-Astrid of Luxembourg, Princess Astrid of Belgium, her great-granddaughter Princess Marie-Astrid of Liechtenstein, and her great-great-granddaughter Archduchess Anna Astrid of Austria-Este. Her niece Princess Astrid of Norway (later Mrs. Ferner) was also named in her honour. Her husband King Leopold III's first daughter with his second wife Lilian Baels, Princess Marie-Christine Daphné Astrid Élisabeth Léopoldine of Belgium (b. 1951), was named after her.

Gallery

Arms

Ancestry

References

Citations

Bibliography

 Catherine Barjansky. "Portraits with Backgrounds."
 Art Beeche. "The Snow Princess."
 Robert Capelle. "Dix-huit ans auprès du Roi Léopold."
 Charles d'Ydewalle. "Albert and the Belgians: Portrait of a King."
 Evelyn Graham. "Albert King of the Belgians."
 
 Luciano Regolo. "La Regina Incompresa."
 Lars Rooth. "More Joy Than Pain."
 Anna Sparre. "Astrid mon amie."

External links

Royal Love Match (1926), newsreel on the British Pathé YouTube Channel
Tragic Death of the Queen of the Belgians (1935), newsreel on the British Pathé YouTube Channel
Portraits of the Nation: Postage Stamps and National Identity
The making of a Belgicist reference to Villa Haslihorn
Packard Club images from the Packard car after the accident
BELGIUM: Death of Astrid Time article
 

|-

1905 births
1935 deaths
Duchesses of Brabant
Belgian queens consort
Naturalised citizens of Belgium
Swedish princesses
House of Bernadotte
Princesses of Saxe-Coburg and Gotha
Dames of Malta
Converts to Roman Catholicism from Lutheranism
Swedish Roman Catholics
Road incident deaths in Switzerland
Belgian princesses
Belgian people of Swedish descent
People from Stockholm
Burials at the Church of Our Lady of Laeken
Former Lutherans
House of Saxe-Coburg and Gotha (Belgium)